John Kemp (14 March 1928 – 14 June 2010) was a South African cricketer. He played in one first-class match for Border in 1947/48. His son John Wesley Kemp also played for Border, and his grandson Justin Kemp played international cricket for South Africa.

See also
 List of Border representative cricketers

References

External links
 

1928 births
2010 deaths
South African cricketers
Border cricketers
People from Queenstown, South Africa
Cricketers from the Eastern Cape